Estadio Nacional de Hockey is a stadium in Quilmes, Argentina. It is mainly used for field hockey and has a capacity of 6,000 spectators.  The stadium hosted the 2007 Women's Hockey Champions Trophy and the 2012 Men's Hockey Champions Challenge I.

External links
 Stadium information 

Field hockey venues in Argentina